Mahasi is a constituency of the Uttar Pradesh Legislative Assembly covering the city of Mahasi in the Bahraich district of Uttar Pradesh, India.

Mahasi is one of five assembly constituencies in the Bahraich Lok Sabha constituency. Since 2008, this assembly constituency is numbered 285 amongst 403 constituencies.

Election results

2022

2017
Bharatiya Janta Party candidate Sureshwar Singh won in 2017 Uttar Pradesh Legislative Elections defeating Indian National Congress candidate Ali Akbar by a margin of 58,969 votes.

References

External links
 

Assembly constituencies of Uttar Pradesh
Politics of Bahraich district